FIFA Soccer 95 is a 1994 football simulation video game developed and published by Electronic Arts. The game was released for the Sega Genesis in November 1994. It is a sequel to FIFA International Soccer and the second game in the FIFA series. It is the only FIFA title to not be released on PC.

Gameplay 
FIFA Soccer 95 is a video game that simulates football. The game utilizes an isometric viewpoint. The player controls one of the eleven footballers on their team, with the ability to switch to control another footballer. The game allows up to four players at the same time, each controlling a different footballer. The players can choose to control a footballer on the same team or on opposing teams. The remaining footballers are controlled by the computer.

Club sides are included for the first time in the series, with clubs from six leagues across Europe; the Premier League in England, Ligue 1 in France, the Bundesliga in Germany, Serie A in Italy, the Eredivisie in the Netherlands and La Liga in Spain. Several clubs from the Campeonato Brasileiro leagues in Brazil and clubs named for cities in the American Professional Soccer League in the US are also included. The licenses did not cover the player names, so fictional names are used instead.

Other new features compared to the previous game include the implementation of the penalty shootout to resolve games that finish in a draw after extra time (FIFA International Soccer had instead used next-goal-wins at the end of extra time).

Reception 
In their review, Mega Machines Sega noted the improvements made to three elements of the gameplay that they considered weak points of the previous game – passing, set-pieces and goalkeeping. Also drawing praise was that the developers had "improved that which didn't seem to need improving". They concluded by describing it as an "excellent update" and the best football game available. 

GamePro was similarly approving; though they were disappointed that there was less chanting and singing than the previous game, they rated FIFA '95 to be "the best soccer game yet." They particularly praised the removal of one-touch passing, saying this makes the game play more realistically, and the retention of most of the elements that made the previous game great.

References

External links 
FIFA Coins & FUT Coins

1994 video games
FIFA (video game series)
Electronic Arts games
EA Sports games
Association football video games
Sega Genesis games
Sega Genesis-only games
Video games scored by Jeff van Dyck
Video games developed in Canada
Video games set in 1994
Video games set in 1995
Video games set in Brazil
Sports video games set in the United States
Video games set in the Netherlands
Video games set in Germany
Video games set in Italy
Video games set in England
Video games set in Spain
Video games set in France